Simone Caputo (born 25 July 1998) is an Italian professional footballer who plays as a forward for AC Fiorano in Eccellenza.

Club career
Caputo is a youth exponent from Sassuolo. He made his UEFA Europa League debut on 29 September 2016 against Genk. He replaced Federico Ricci after 79 minutes.

On 17 August 2018, he joined fifth-tier club AC Fiorano.

References

1998 births
Footballers from Munich
Living people
Italian footballers
U.S. Sassuolo Calcio players
Latina Calcio 1932 players
Serie D players
Association football forwards